The Court of Appeal of Quebec (sometimes referred to as Quebec Court of Appeal or QCA) (in French: la Cour d'appel du Québec) is the highest judicial court in Quebec, Canada.  It hears cases in Quebec City and Montreal.

History 
The Court was created on May 30, 1849, as the Court of Queen's Bench (Cour du Banc de la Reine in French) – or Court of King's Bench (Cour du Banc du Roi in French) depending on the gender of the current Monarch serving as head of state first of the United Kingdom, then of Canada. The Court's judges had jurisdiction to try criminal cases until 1920, when it was transferred to the Superior Court. In 1974, it was officially renamed the Quebec Court of Appeal.

Jurisdiction 
Under the Code of Civil Procedure of Quebec and the Criminal Code, someone wishing to appeal a decision of the either the Superior Court of Quebec or the Court of Quebec generally has 30 days to file an appeal with the Court of Appeal.  Final judgments in civil cases are appellable as of right if the amount in dispute is at least $60,000 in dispute to be heard.  The Court of Appeal will overrule a lower court decision if it is "incorrect" on a question of law or if a "palpable and overriding error" was made on questions of fact or mixed fact and law.  The Court of Appeal almost never hears witnesses, and lawyers' oral and written submissions are kept to strict maximum lengths. A normal case will take several months from filing of an appeal to a decision by the Court of Appeal, but the Court may hear an appeal within hours or days in an emergency.

Appeals of Court of Appeal decisions are heard before the Supreme Court of Canada in Ottawa, but only if leave to appeal is granted either by the Supreme Court of Canada or by the Court of Appeal. Notwithstanding this, in very limited circumstances, a decision of the Court of Appeal may be appealed to the Supreme Court of Canada as of right.

The ability of the Supreme Court of Canada, which has six of its nine justices from common law provinces and only three from the civil law province of Quebec, to overrule the Court of Appeal of Quebec has occasionally been raised as a political issue by Quebec nationalists, who worry that it erodes Quebec's distinctive legal culture.

Perhaps the most significant decision of the Court of Appeal was Morgentaler v R (1974), in which the Court of Appeal overturned a jury decision acquitting Montreal Doctor Henry Morgentaler of performing an abortion, despite Morgentaler publicly admitting that he had done so.  This was the first time in Canada that a jury acquittal had been replaced by a conviction, on appeal, rather than a new trial being ordered.  The Court of Appeal was overturned by the Supreme Court of Canada in 1975. Subsequently, Parliament amended the Criminal Code removing the ability of provincial courts of appeal to substitute jury acquittals with convictions.

Composition 
As a "Superior Court" under section 96 of the Constitution Act, 1867, Court of Appeal judges are appointed by the Governor-General of Canada on the advice of the Prime Minister of Canada (in practical terms the advice is always followed).  Appointees must be members of the Quebec Bar, but need not have had previous experience as a judge.  However, appointees almost always have some experience as a judge, usually on the Superior Court of Quebec.  The quorum of the Court of Appeal of Quebec for appeals on the merits is generally three judges, but the Court has also sat five judges in exceptional circumstances, and in one recent extremely exceptional case, the Court sat seven judges. However, for Applications seeking leave to appeal and most other applications in the course of the proceeding, quorum is composed of only one judge of the Court of Appeal.

Originally, the Court had four judges, including the Chief Justice. It is currently constituted of 22 judges, including the Chief Justice. By statute, fifteen of the judges must reside in Montreal, while seven must reside in Quebec City.

Current judges

Supernumerary judge

Former justices

 Julien Chouinard (1974 – September 1979)
 Claire L'Heureux-Dubé (1979 – April 1987)
 Antonio Lamer (1978 - March 1980)
 Louis LeBel (June 1984 – January 2000)
 Morris Fish (June 1989 – August 2003)
 Marie Deschamps (March 1992 – August 2002)
 Jean-Louis Baudouin (May 1989 – 2008)
 Richard Wagner (February 2011 – October 2012)
 Clément Gascon (April 10, 2012 - June 9, 2014)
 Joseph Nuss 
 J. Michel Robert

Chief Justice of Lower Canada

 William Smith (judge, born 1728) 1791-1793
 William Osgoode 1794-1801
 John Elmsley 1802-1805
 Henry Allcock 1805-1808
 Jonathan Sewell 1808-1838
 Sir James Stuart, 1st Baronet 1838-1841

Chief Justice of Canada East

 Sir James Stuart, 1st Baronet 1841-49

Chief Justice of Court of Queen's Bench

 Sir James Stuart, 1st Baronet 1849-53

References

External links

Official website 

Canadian appellate courts
Quebec courts
1849 establishments in Canada
Courts and tribunals established in 1849